My Steve is a biographical account of Terri Irwin's life with her late husband, the zoo owner and television personality Steve Irwin. It was published by Simon & Schuste Australia.

Reviewer Bruce Elder wrote: "Terri Irwin tells a simple story with considerable passion and straightforward honesty".

References

2007 non-fiction books
Australian memoirs